is a 1994 fighting video game developed and published by Bandai and Ecofilmes for the Sega Mega Drive. Based upon Akira Toriyama's Dragon Ball franchise, it is the only game in the series released for the Mega Drive, following the Frieza and Cell sagas. Its gameplay has been described as a combination of the original Super Butōden and Super Butōden 2, consisting of one-on-one fights using a three-button configuration, featuring special moves and two playable modes.

With the popularity of the Dragon Ball franchise in European regions and the positive reception of the first Super Butōden entry on Super Famicom, Bandai decided developing Dragon Ball Z: Buyū Retsuden for the Mega Drive but its creation process lasted longer than the Super Butōden sub-series. Buyū Retsuden proved popular among players and garnered generally positive reception from critics; Some reviewers praised the addition of characters not featured in the previous Super NES games, split-screen mechanic, audiovisual presentation and gameplay, but other stated it was not on par with both Street Fighter II: The World Warrior and Mortal Kombat, criticizing certain design choices and slow pacing.

Gameplay 

Dragon Ball Z: Buyū Retsuden is a fighting game similar to Street Fighter II. Players fight against other characters in 1-on-1 matches and the fighter who manages to deplete the health bar of the opponent wins the match. The game has two modes of play; Story and Versus. The roster features 11 playable characters: Goku, Gohan, Krillin, Piccolo, Vegeta, Captain Ginyu, Recoome, Frieza, Future Trunks, Android 18 and Cell. Gameplay is quite similar to the Super Butōden entries for SNES; it features the split-screen mechanic that allows the player to stay far from the opponents and perform an energy Ki blast. When a Ki blast is performed far away, the opponent has very little time to defend themselves from it. Buyū Retsuden uses a three-button control scheme; "A" punches, "B" kicks and "C" switches between staying on land or sky. Special moves can be performed via button combinations.

Development and release 
Dragon Ball Z: Buyū Retsuden was first published in Japan by Bandai on April 1, 1994, then in France and Spain in June 1994 under the name  Dragon Ball Z: L'Appel du Destin, and two years later in Portugal by Ecofilmes under the name Dragon Ball Z. The French/Spanish release features a French translation, while Ecofilmes would take Japanese copies of the game to replace both the cover and manual (but keeping the cartridge) to sell the game as is by promising a free converter cartridge, as the Japanese cartridges cannot fit into European Mega Drive units, but later switched to using the French release instead. Because the Super Famicom dominated the Japanese market, most licensed game titles based on manga and anime properties were released for this platform. However, sales of the Sega Mega Drive were even higher than the SNES in Europe. With the popularity of the Dragon Ball franchise in countries like France and Spain, the original Super Butoden for the SNES was so well-received that Bandai decided the development of a Dragon Ball game for the Mega Drive and its development process was higher than the Super Butoden sub-series. Buyū Retsuden was headed by producer Yasuo Miyakawa, with Tadashi Megumi acting as a co-programmer. Artists Hideki Suzuki, Hiromi Ishii and Kishiko Matsubara were responsible for the pixel art, while Shinji Amagishi served as one of the composers. Other members also collaborated in its development.

Reception 

Dragon Ball Z: Buyū Retsuden received generally positive reception from critics, though most reviewers noted similarities with previous Dragon Ball Z fighting games on Super NES. Public reception was also positive: readers of Mega Drive Fan magazine and the Japanese Sega Saturn Magazine voted to give the game scores of 21.3 out of 30 and 7.3415 out of 10 respectively, ranking at the number 229 spot in a poll of the former publication, indicating a popular following.

Likewise, Olivier Prézeau and Grégoire Hellot of  commended the addition of characters missing from the Super Famicom entries, graphics, sound design and game modes but criticized the controls for being annoying. In a similar manner, a reviewer of French magazine  gave it positive comments to the animated visuals for recreating Toriyama's universe and sound but criticized its inadequate controls. Hobby Consolass Esther Barral gave very high remarks to the graphics, sound design, addictive gameplay and character roster, regarding it to be a well done Street Fighter II-style game, although she noted the learning curve of special attacks and moves in a negative light.

Christophe Delpierre of  commended the audiovisual presentation, French translation and playability. However, Delpierre personally found Dragon Ball Z: L'Appel du Destin to be worse than the SNES entries but noted that the game should satisfy Dragon Ball Z fans on the Sega Mega Drive. Sega Zones Lee Brown gave positive comments to the anime-esque visuals but felt mixed about aspects of the split-screen mechanic and criticized the sound design, while regarding its gameplay to be not as good as Street Fighter II. As with Barral, Francisco Javier Bautista of  gave very high remarks to the title's graphics, music, gameplay and story mode but criticized the lack of additional difficulty levels and options. Mean Machines Segas Lucy Hickman and Gus Swan noted its split-screen mechanic, sound design, amount of moves and game modes in a positive manner but both editors criticized the graphics and animations for being plain and jerky respectively, lack of variety in the music, enemy AI and retail price, with Hickman regarding it to be a Street Fighter II clone. Megas Paul Mellerick also regarded it to be not as good as Street Fighter II or Mortal Kombat, criticizing its slow pacing. Nevertheless, Mellerick praised the presentation, gameplay and other aspects.

MegaTechs Rich Lloyd and Allie West regarded the split-screen mechanic to be innovative although not as refined as on SNES, while both reviewers praised the anime-style graphics, sound design and learning curve but criticized its overall longevity. Sega Powers Simon Kirrane commended its faithful manga-style presentation of both characters and stages, as well as the split-screen mechanic but criticized the sprite animations, controls and gameplay. In contrast, Sega Pros Jason Johnson criticized the sluggish sprite animations, sound design and gameplay. Jeuxvideo.coms Rroyd-Y gave positive remarks to the graphics and story mode but criticized its controls for being similar to the first Super Butōden on SNES, as well as its stiff and slow gameplay, stating that "this unique episode on Megadrive is nothing other than a port of Dragon Ball Z 1, which allows itself to bring absolutely nothing new, and even to do less well in terms of content."

Notes

References

External links 

 Dragon Ball Z: Buyū Retsuden at GameFAQs
 Dragon Ball Z: Buyū Retsuden at Giant Bomb
 Dragon Ball Z: Buyū Retsuden at MobyGames

1994 video games
Bandai games
Buyū Retsuden
Fighting games
Multiplayer and single-player video games
Sega Genesis games
Sega Genesis-only games
Split-screen multiplayer games
Video games developed in Japan